High Cross, Cornwall, may refer to:

High Cross, Constantine, a hamlet in the Civil Parish of Constantine, Kerrier
High Cross, Truro, also the name of a cobbled plaza in Truro 
High Cross Street, in the centre of St Austell, between Holy Trinity Church and the Railway line 
A residential road of the same name, south of the Newquay Road in St Columb Major